Phidippus putnami is a species of jumping spider found in the United States.

Gallery

References

External links

 Salticidae.org's page on Phidippus putnami
 More pictures and information of P. putnami at BugGuide

Salticidae
Spiders of the United States
Spiders described in 1883